The Cornwall Hockey Association Plate, commonly referred to as the Cornwall Plate or simply The Plate, is a knockout cup competition in Field Hockey for clubs based in Cornwall.  The competition is the second-tier knockout competition run by the Cornwall Hockey Association, and is contested by clubs who are eliminated from the Cornwall Hockey Association Knockout Cup in the early stages of that competition. The competition is contested by both male and female hockey teams within the county of Cornwall.

As of the 2017-18, the competitions included are the Men's Plate and Women's Plate, the reigning champions are Truro 2nd XI and Caradon 2nd XI respectively.

Competitions and Format

Men's Plate 
As of the 2016-17 Season, The Men's Plate is contested by those teams finishing as runners-up in the Group (or round robin) stage of the CHA Cup.  The four entered teams contest a single-elimination semi-final and final to determine the competition winner.

Women's Plate 
Since the inception of the competition, the Women's Cup has followed a single elimination knockout format, consisting of up to four rounds of matches. Eligible teams are those who were defeated in their opening game in the CHA Cup.

Previous Winners

References

External links 
 http://www.cornwallhockey.org

 
Field hockey cup competitions in England